The 1869 Kildare by-election was fought on 11 January 1869.  The by-election was fought due to the incumbent Liberal MP, Lord Otho Fitzgerald, becoming Comptroller of the Household.  It was retained by Fitzgerald who was unopposed.

References

1869 elections in the United Kingdom
By-elections to the Parliament of the United Kingdom in County Kildare constituencies
Ministerial by-elections to the Parliament of the United Kingdom
Unopposed ministerial by-elections to the Parliament of the United Kingdom (need citation)
January 1869 events
1869 elections in Ireland